The Liverpool Court of Passage was, at the time of its abolition, a local court of record which actively exercised a civil jurisdiction comparable to or greater than that of the county court for the district in which it was situated.

Procedure
The procedure of this court was amended by the Liverpool Court of Passage Act 1896 (59 & 60 Vict c 21).

Jurisdiction
As to the jurisdiction of this court, see the Liverpool Corporation Act 1921 (11 & 12 Geo. 5. c. lxxiv.).

Admiralty jurisdiction

See sections 2 to 4 of the Administration of Justice 1956.

Abolition
The Liverpool Court of Passage was abolished by section 43(1)(b) of the Courts Act 1971.

Offices

Any judicial or other office in the Liverpool Court of Passage was abolished by section 44(1)(b) of the Courts Act 1971.

Section 44(2) conferred a power to make regulations to provide for the compensation of persons who suffered loss of employment or loss or diminution of emoluments attributable to the effect of section 44(1)(b) or to the abolition of the Liverpool Court of Passage.

Transitional provisions

Transitional provisions were made by section 43(2) of, and Part III of Schedule 5 to the Courts Act 1971.

Public Records
Records of the Liverpool Court of Passage are public records within the meaning of the Public Records Act 1958.

See also
Liverpool

References
Halsbury's Laws of England, First Edition, Volume 9
Walter Peel. The Jurisdiction and Practice of the Court of Passage of the City of Liverpool. Henry Young and Sons. Liverpool. 1909. Revised Edition. 1934.
J H Layton. The Court of Passage of the City of Liverpool. Liverpool Central Stationery and Print Co. 1904.
Charles Russell. The Practice of the Court of Passage of the Borough of Liverpool. Rockliff Bros. Liverpool. 1862.

Former courts and tribunals in England and Wales
Legal history of England
1971 disestablishments in England
Courts and tribunals disestablished in 1971